Par or PAR may refer to:

Finance
 Par value, stated value or face value in finance and accounting
 Par yield or par rate, in finance

Games
 Par (score), the number of strokes a scratch golfer should require to complete a hole, round or tournament
 Par (golf scoring format), an alternative to Stableford and normal stroke play
 Par contract, in contract bridge

Organizations

Businesses
 Pan Am Railways, an American holding company
 Par Pharmaceutical, now part of Endo International
 PaR Systems, an American automation company

Politicial parties
 Aragonese Party (Partido Aragonés, PAR), Spain
 Movement For! (Kustība Par!), Latvia
 Party for the Restructured Antilles (Partido Antiá Restrukturá, PAR), Curaçao
 Revolutionary Action Party ('Partido Acción Revolucionaria', PAR), Guatemala

Other organizations
 Parkinson Association of the Rockies, a not-for-profit organization
 Pretoria Armoured Regiment, an armour regiment of the South African Army

Places
 Par, Cornwall, England
Par railway station
 Par, Iran
 Par, Vologda Oblast, Russia
 Par, Tibet
 Philippine Area of Responsibility, a weather monitoring area in the northwest Pacific 
 Paraguay
 Parkesburg station, Pennsylvania, U.S., station code PAR
 PAR, IATA airport code for the metropolitan area of Paris, France
 Par River (disambiguation), the name of several rivers

Science and technology

Biology and medicine
 Par (fly), a signal fly in the family Platystomatidae
 Photosynthetically active radiation, a range of solar radiation
 Post-anesthesia recovery, part of a hospital
 Predictive adaptive response in biology
 Protease-activated receptors PAR1, PAR2, PAR3, PAR4
 Pseudoautosomal regions on sex chromosomes

Computing
 par (command), a text formatting utility for Unix
 Page address register, containing physical addresses
 Perl Archive Toolkit, a deployment tool
 Personal Animation Recorder, video capture for Amiga computers
 Pixel aspect ratio, in digital imaging
 .par, .par2, .par3, filename extensions of Parchive

Other uses in science and technology
 Parabolic aluminized reflector, PAR lamp or PAR, a type of electric lamp
 Participatory action research, a social sciences research approach
 Passive autocatalytic recombiner, device that removes hydrogen from a nuclear power plant during an accident
 Par meter, to measure peak-to-average ratio in an electrical circuit
 Precision approach radar, a radar guidance system

See also

 Parsec (disambiguation)
 Paragraph
 Pull to par, in finance